Lake Pleasant Regional Park is a large outdoors recreation area straddling the Maricopa and Yavapai county border northwest of Phoenix, Arizona. The park is located within the municipal boundaries of Peoria, Arizona, and serves as a major recreation hub for the northwest Phoenix metropolitan area.

Lake Pleasant
Created by the Carl Pleasant Dam, which was finished in 1927, and upon completion, was the largest multi-arch dam in the world. The lake was filled by the Agua Fria River, capturing a large watershed throughout Yavapai County.

Construction of the Central Arizona Project Aqueduct, which began in 1973, soon diverted water from the Colorado River to the lake, converting the lake from an agricultural project into a storage reservoir for the project. Completed in 1994, the New Waddell Dam tripled the surface area of the lake, submerging the old dam beneath its waters.  Shortly after the completion of the dam, the area experienced a prolonged drought, and while the lake grew considerably it would not reach full capacity until early 2005.  Although still fed by the Agua Fria River, the CAP aqueduct is the primary source of water for the reservoir.

Lake Pleasant is used as a major water sports recreation center for the Phoenix metro area, as well as serving as an important storage reservoir for the rapidly growing region.  A number of boat docks and beach access make the lake a popular destination for scuba diving, water skiing, jet skiing, sailing, windsurfing and other water sports.

The lake has been plagued by a number of deaths over the years, and Arizona authorities have from time to time called for caution when at Lake Pleasant because of a number of reasons, including rising waters and carbon monoxide in the area.

Lake Pleasant Fish Species
 Threadfin Shad
 Bluegill
 Redear Sunfish
 Green Sunfish
 Black Crappie
 White Crappie
 Largemouth Bass
 Smallmouth Bass
 White Bass
 Striped Bass
 Channel Catfish
 Flathead Catfish
 Common Carp
 Tilapia

Potential Fish Species
 Sucker
 Gizzard Shad
 Yellow Perch
 Walleye
 Northern Pike
 Muskellunge
 Rainbow Trout
 Blue Catfish
 Bullhead
 Goldfish
 Buffalo

Potential Aquarium Released Species
 Peacock Bass
 Arowana
 Cichlids
 Pacu
 Rocket Gar
 Ripsaw Catfish
 Bala Shark
 Colombian Shark
 Iridescent Shark
 Rainbow Shark
 Red Tail Shark
 Silver Apollo Shark

Other uses

The park covers a total of over 23,000 acres (93 km2) of mountainous desert landscape, including the lake, and boasts a number of other recreational activities, such as mountain biking, camping, and hiking.  The park also has an educational visitors' center that provides information regarding the history of the lake, the construction of the Waddell Dam and the surrounding areas.

The presence of the lake has also attracted other recreational activities in the area, such as a dirt racetrack and a large glider school/airport.

The rapidly growing city of Peoria has annexed the park and surrounding lands with an eye on future development, though 2007–2008 economic downturn has brought a temporary halt to its plans.  Economy aside, the increasing popularity of the area is evidenced by rapidly growing subdivisions to the south, such as Vistancia, and skyrocketing real estate values, the city has zoned much of the land in the immediate vicinity for future use of both high-end waterfront residential neighborhoods and commercial opportunities off of Lake Pleasant Parkway and the Carefree Highway.  Several plans also call for potentially expanding the existing airstrip to be expanded into a regional airport.

Annual events
Lake Pleasant Paddle Fest is a full day event featuring different paddle craft and fun activities.

Bill Luke Bass Days is a day and night time festival taking place at Lake Pleasant Marina featuring carnival rides, cornhole tournament, wildlife exhibits, vendors, food and live music.

Transportation 
The area was served by Pleasant Valley Airport, located 3 miles away. Plans to start commercial service to the airport, including from Phoenix Sky Harbor International Airport, were unsuccessful.

Several roads connect the area to Phoenix's main freeway systems.

Scenery
The following pictures are of some of the scenery at Lake Pleasant Regional Park and the ruins of a thousand year old Hohokam Puebloans village.

See also
 Bradshaw Mountains
 Castle Hot Springs (Arizona)
 Hells Canyon Wilderness (Arizona)
 Hieroglyphic Mountains
 Indian Mesa
 Lake Pleasant Camp
 Maricopa Trail

External links
 Lake Pleasant Regional Park Website
 Arizona Boating Locations Facilities Map
 Lake Pleasant Arizona Recreation
 Arizona Game & Fish – Fishing Locations
 Video of Lake Pleasant

References

Geography of Peoria, Arizona
Parks in Maricopa County, Arizona
Parks in Yavapai County, Arizona
Regional parks in the United States
Pleasant
Pleasant
Pleasant